"Innocent" is a song by Canadian alternative rock band Our Lady Peace. It was released in August 2002 as the second single from their fifth studio album Gravity. It was written by lead vocalist Raine Maida. Following its release, it reached the top 40 on two US Billboard rock charts, as well as on the New Zealand Singles Chart.

Background and writing
Lead vocalist Raine Maida stated in 2002 that "Innocent" was one of his favorite songs from Gravity. "I wrote this song over a year ago and I was originally hesitant to play it for the band, but once we got into the studio and began working with Bob we were able to make it an Our Lady Peace song."

According to Raine, the title of the song was originally "Arrogant" and featured different lyrics. Producer Bob Rock made him rewrite most of the songs from Gravity in order to make them more accessible and easier to understand.

Content
The song is about young people who are going through a difficult phase in their lives, namely Johnny, who wants to be a famous musician but struggles with writing songs, and Tina, who is insecure about her body and appearance. The song also references legendary rock musicians John Lennon and Kurt Cobain.

Recording
Local school children in Hawaii were used to sing background vocals on the chorus of the song.

Before Mike Turner left the band, he recorded the rhythm guitar for this track. It would later be interlaced with Steve Mazur's guitar playing for the final recording, but Turner's style of playing is still recognized.

Music video
The music video for "Innocent" was filmed on August 31, 2002 in Syracuse, Los Angeles, New Orleans, and a school parking lot in Toronto. It features the band performing in an alley while showing people going through various struggles. 
The music video went to win two MuchMusic Video Awards in 2003, including "Best Video."

Track listings
Canadian CD single
 "Innocent" (album version) – 3:42
 "Whatever" (live) – 4:00

Charts

Weekly charts

Year-end charts

In popular culture
The song was featured in an episode of the eighth season of Scrubs titled "My Lawyer's in Love".

References

2002 singles
2002 songs
Our Lady Peace songs
Song recordings produced by Bob Rock
Songs written by Raine Maida